Glenn Olsson (born 22 September 1976) is a Swedish biathlete. He competed in the men's 20 km individual event at the 1994 Winter Olympics.

References

External links
 

1976 births
Living people
Swedish male biathletes
Olympic biathletes of Sweden
Biathletes at the 1994 Winter Olympics
People from Torsby Municipality
20th-century Swedish people